The following is a '''list of former attractions at Knott's Berry Farm.

Former attractions

See also
Knott's Berry Farm

References

External links